The 2010 Women's Australian Hockey League was the 18th edition of the women's field hockey tournament. The finals week of the tournament was held in the South Australian city of Adelaide.

The WA Diamonds won the gold medal for the sixth time by defeating the QLD Scorchers 3–1 in the final.

Competition format

The format included five-round matches over two weekends, and a finals week that consisted of two-round matches, three pool matches and finally classification matches.

At the conclusion of the round matches teams were sorted in Pool A or Pool B, based on ranking.

Pool A: 1, 4, 6, 8
Pool B: 2, 3, 5, 7

Points were carried over from the round matches, so at the conclusion of the pool matches the teams in each pool were ranked again 1–4 depending on the number of points accumulated, with the top team from each pool competing in the League Final, while classification matches were contested to determine the remaining six teams' final positions.

Teams

  Canberra Strikers
  Southern Suns

  NSW Arrows
  Tassie Van Demons

  Territory Pearls
  VIC Vipers

  QLD Scorchers
  WA Diamonds

Results

Preliminary round

Round matches

Classification round

Pool A

Pool B

Classification matches

Seventh and eighth place

Fifth and sixth place

Third and fourth place

Final

Awards

Statistics

Final standings

Goalscorers

External links

References

2012
2012 in Australian women's field hockey
Sports competitions in Adelaide